Robber baron may refer to:

 Robber baron (feudalism), term for unscrupulous medieval landowners
 Robber baron (industrialist), term for unscrupulous 19th-century American businessmen